José Pereira (born 21 June 1918, date of death unknown) was a Portuguese modern pentathlete. He competed at the 1952 Summer Olympics.

References

External links
 

1918 births
Year of death missing
Portuguese male modern pentathletes
Olympic modern pentathletes of Portugal
Modern pentathletes at the 1952 Summer Olympics